116 kDa U5 small nuclear ribonucleoprotein component is a protein that in humans is encoded by the EFTUD2 gene.

Disease associations 

Heterozygous loss-of-function mutations in EFTUD2 cause Mandibulofacial Dysostosis with Microcephaly (MFDM; OMIM #610536), a multiple malformation syndrome comprising progressive microcephaly (present in all affected individuals), craniofacial skeletal anomalies, cleft palate, deafness, choanal atresia, small stature, and/or cardiac and thumb anomalies.

Interactions 

EFTUD2 has been shown to interact with WDR57 and PRPF8.

References

Further reading